Soap Opera is a 2014 Italian comedy film written and directed  by Alessandro Genovesi. It opened the 2014 Rome Film Festival.

Plot 
In a small building in Milan, on the eve of New Year, all the neighbors are struggling with their stories. Francesco loves Anna, but their story is broken by Paolo, who claims to be gay and in love with Francesco. All of them are upset and bring the case to the police. Francesco and Anna manage to find love a few seconds before the new year.

Cast 
 
Fabio De Luigi as  Francesco
Cristiana Capotondi as Anna
Diego Abatantuono as Carabiniere Gaetano Cavallo
Chiara Francini as Alice
Ricky Memphis as Paolo
Elisa Sednaoui as Francesca
Franz as  Mario
Ale as Gianni
Caterina Guzzanti as Patrizia

References

External links 

2014 films
2014 comedy films
Italian comedy films
Films directed by Alessandro Genovesi
2010s Italian films
2010s Italian-language films